Alive in Detroit (2007) is the first live album by Detroit-based Alternative Rock band Sponge.

Track listing
"Wax Ecstatic (To Sell Angelina)" (Vin Dombroski) – 4:36 
"Molly" (Dombroski, Joe Mazzola, Paluzzi, Mike Rygiel) – 4:15
"Rotting Piñata" (Dombroski, Mazzola, Paluzzi, Rygiel) – 4:43
"Glue" (Dombroski) – 5:52 
"Have You Seen Mary" (Dombroski, Rygiel) – 4:54
"My Lackluster Love" (Dombroski, Rygiel) – 5:05
"Party Till We Drop" (Dombroski, Mark Scott) – 5:17 
"Silence Is Their Drug" (Dombroski) – 3:43 
"Treat Me Wrong" (Dombroski, Mazzola) – 3:37
"Plowed" (Dombroski, Mazzola, Paluzzi, Rygiel) – 3:41
"For All the Drugs in the World" (Dombroski) – 6:19 
"My Purity" (Dombroski, Rygiel) – 3:51

Personnel 

Vinnie Dombroski – vocals 
Billy Adams – drums 
Kyle Neely – guitar 
Andy Patalan – guitar/backing vocals 
Tim Krukowski – bass

References

 Track Listing Reference

Sponge (band) albums
2007 albums